Ptychotrema mazumbiensis is a species of air-breathing land snail, a terrestrial pulmonate gastropod mollusk in the family Streptaxidae.

This species is endemic to Tanzania. Its natural habitat is subtropical or tropical dry forests. It is threatened by habitat loss.

References

Streptaxidae
Gastropods described in 1999
Taxonomy articles created by Polbot